Verlorene Kulmke is a small river of Lower Saxony, Germany. It flows into the Kleine Kulmke west of Sankt Andreasberg.

See also
List of rivers of Lower Saxony

Rivers of Lower Saxony
Rivers of Germany